White Horse is the title of the first solo album by Michael Omartian, released originally in 1974, on Dunhill Records and subsequently re-released on Myrrh Records as both a single album and as a compilation of White Horse and Adam Again. (Both are now out-of-print.) Integrating elements of funk, gospel, and progressive rock (and utilizing the talents of some of the finest studio musicians and back-up singers of the time), White Horse is considered by some critics of contemporary Christian rock music, including Marty Phillips of Jesus Rock Legends (jrocklegends.wordpress.com), to be one of the most influential and revered albums of the genre.

In his Allmusic review, Mark W.B. Allender wrote, "... this record cooks from beginning to end. Christian Contemporary Music has never been so hip. CCM in general has a reputation for being watered down and unemotional, but this record squeaked through without any dilution at all... this record is his masterpiece."

Track listing
All songs written by Michael & Stormie Omartian.

Side one
 "Jeremiah" – 4:37
 "Fat City" – 3:09
 "Orphan" – 2:01
 "Silver Fish" – 2:34
 "Add Up The Wonders" – 5:19

Side two
 "Take Me Down" – 3:39
 "Right From The Start" – 2:30
 "Rest Is Up To You" – 2:47
 "White Horse" – 7:06

Personnel 
 Michael Omartian – vocals, keyboards, percussion, tom tom (6), steel drums (8)
 Larry Carlton – guitars, lead guitar (8), bass (8, 9)
 Dean Parks – guitars, guitar solo (1), flute (4), alto sax solo (9)
 David Hungate – bass (1, 4, 5)
 Wilton Felder – bass (2, 6)
 David Kemper – drums (1, 4, 5, 9)
 Ed Greene – drums (2, 6, 8)
 Alan Estes – drumbeg (1)
 King Errisson – congas (6)
 Jackie Kelso – tenor saxophone
 Don Menza – tenor saxophone
 Paul Hubinon – trumpet, French horn, trumpet solo (1)
 The Sid Sharp Strings – strings (3, 7)
Jesse Ehrlich – cello (9)
 Patricia Henderson – backing vocals
 Stormie Omartian – backing vocals
 Carolyn Willis – backing vocals
 Ann White – backing vocals

Production 
 Michael Omartian – producer, arrangements 
 Michael Lietz – recording (1, 5, 7), mixing (7)
 Tommy Vicari – mixing (1-6, 8, 9), recording (2, 3, 6, 8)
 John Guess – recording (4, 9)
 The Mastering Lab (Hollywood, California) – mastering location 
 David Jarvis – album cover artwork 
 James Fitzgerald – album cover concept, management 
 Harry Langdon – photography

References

1974 debut albums
Michael Omartian albums
Albums produced by Michael Omartian